Feldstein is a surname common among Ashkenazi Jews.  Notable people with the surname include:

 Al Feldstein (1925-2014), American painter
 Beanie Feldstein (born 1993), American actress and singer
 Cemach Feldstein (1884-1944), Russian Jewish educator murdered by the Nazis
 Jack Feldstein, Australian animator
 Jonah Hill Feldstein (born 1983), American actor
 Jordan Feldstein (1977–2017), manager for Maroon 5
 Lewis M. Feldstein, American attorney
 Mark Feldstein (1937-2001), American artist and photographer
 Martin "Marty" S. Feldstein (1939-2013), American economist
 Ruth Feldstein, American historian

German-language surnames